Prema Pipasi is a 2020 Telugu-language romantic comedy film produced by PS Ramakrishna under SS Art Productions. The film was directed by Murali Ramaswamy and stars GPS, Suman, Kapilakshi Malhotra and Adnan Javid Khan

Cast 
GPS as Bawa
Kapilakshi Malhotra as Bala
Suman
Sonakshi
Funbucket Bharga
Adnan Javid Khan

References

External links 
 

2020 films
2020 romantic comedy films
2020s Telugu-language films
Indian romantic comedy films